Humberto Soriano (born April 18, 1991) is an American soccer player.

External links
 USL Pro profile

1991 births
Living people
American soccer players
Yavapai Roughriders men's soccer players
Phoenix FC players
Association football goalkeepers
Soccer players from Arizona